736 Naval Air Squadron (736 NAS) was a Naval Air Squadron of the Royal Navy. It was most recently recommissioned at RNAS Culdrose on 6 June 2013 to fly the BAE Systems Hawk T1, following the disbandment of the Fleet Requirements and Aircraft Direction Unit (FRADU) and operated up until March 2022.

History

Formation and early years

The squadron was first formed at RNAS Yeovilton on 24 May 1943 as an air combat training squadron for naval aviators, before moving to RNAS St Merryn in September that year. Between 1943 and 1952 the squadron operated several piston-engined aircraft including the Supermarine Seafire, Fairey Barracuda, Hawker Sea Fury and Fairey Firefly.

The jet age

The squadron moved to RNAS Culdrose in 1950 where, in August 1952, it was eventually disbanded as piston-engined squadron and reformed as the Advanced Jet Flying School; operating Supermarine Attacker and Meteor T.7 jet aircraft.

It was recommissioned at RNAS Lossiemouth in June 1953 as a training squadron for Sea Vampire and Hawker Sea Hawk. In 1959 the squadron was equipped with Supermarine Scimitar F.1 aircraft under the command of Lieutenant Commander J.D. Baker, to provide support for operational squadrons. As Scimitars started to be phased out of first-line servicing, 736 Squadron was disbanded on 26 March 1965.

736 NAS reformed shortly afterward with the Blackburn Buccaneer S.2, using aircraft and aircrews from the recently disbanded 700B Flight (the Buccaneer S.2 Intensive Flying Trials Unit) in order to train aircrews for the aircraft. Still based at RNAS Lossiemouth, from 1967 onwards the unit shared a pool of aircraft with 803 NAS, the Buccaneer HQ and weapons trials unit. With the decision to transfer all the RN's Buccaneers to the RAF, 736 NAS took on the extra task of training RAF crews. To cope with this, several Buccaneer S.1s were taken out of storage to increase the numbers of aircraft available, and a number of RAF aircrew who had previously served exchange tours with FAA Buccaneer squadrons were posted to 736 NAS as instructors. After a few accidents due to engine problems the S.1s were withdrawn from service in 1970. In 1971 the RAF stood up their own operational conversion unit (237 OCU) to take over the training of both their own and the dwindling number of RN aircrews.

736 NAS was finally disbanded in early 1972 until it was recommissioned in 2013 under the command of Lt Cdr Tim Flatman. Now operating the Fleet Air Arm's BAe Hawk T1/T1A twin-seat fast-jet aircraft, the squadron has replaced the Fleet Requirements and Air Direction Unit (FRADU), acting as the Royal Navy's 'Adversary' squadron. In 2014 the squadron's aircraft began to be re-painted in its new markings and the first aircraft to receive the new look was XX240.

Since the squadron reformed it has supported numerous exercises within the UK (including Joint Warrior, which is held in Scotland) and overseas. These overseas exercises include 'Cougar 14' and 'Cougar 16' where the squadron operated in Albania and Deep Blue 2 in 2016 when the squadron operated from Gibraltar.

The Hawk's role was to be replaced by the Air Support to Defence Operational Training (ASDOT) programme which would have provided aggressor training to all three British armed services, however the project was cancelled in March 2019. The Royal Navy announced that the squadron was to disband after a final fly past on 22 March 2022. The squadron decommissioned on 31 March 2022 after its aircraft departed Culdrose the week before.

References

External links
 

700 series Fleet Air Arm squadrons